Canaima is a genus of cellar spiders that was first described by B. A. Huber in 2000.

Species 
 it contains eight species, found in Venezuela and Trinidad:

 Canaima arima (Gertsch, 1982) (type) – Trinidad
 Canaima avila Huber, 2020 – Venezuela
 Canaima guaquira Huber, 2020 – Venezuela
 Canaima guaraque Huber, 2020 – Venezuela
 Canaima loca Huber, 2020 – Venezuela
 Canaima merida Huber, 2000 – Venezuela
 Canaima perlonga Huber, 2020 – Venezuela
 Canaima zerpa Huber, 2020 – Venezuela

See also
 List of Pholcidae species

References

Araneomorphae genera
Pholcidae